Holden Matthews may refer to:
 A character in  the Beyond TV series, played by Burkeley Duffield.
A suspect in the arson of three African-American churches in St. Landry Parish, Louisiana in 2019.